Silverbridge  is a small village in the townland of Legmoylin in County Armagh, Northern Ireland. It is within the Newry and Mourne District Council area. In the 2011 Census it had a recorded population of 112. The local GAA club is Silverbridge Harps GFC, which plays football at Intermediate level in county competitions. The area was historically called Belanargit (from Béal Átha an Airgid meaning "ford mouth of the silver").

History
Silverbridge, along with the rest of South Armagh, would have been transferred to the Irish Free State had the recommendations of the Irish Boundary Commission been enacted in 1925.

On 19 December 1975, during The Troubles, an Ulster Volunteer Force attack on Donnelly's Bar & Filling Station resulted in the deaths of Trevor Bracknell, Patrick Donnelly, and Michael Donnelly.

References

Sources
NI Neighbourhood Information System

See also
List of villages in Northern Ireland
List of towns in Northern Ireland

Villages in County Armagh